Uvarus is a genus of beetles in the family Dytiscidae, containing the following species:

 Uvarus alluaudi (Régimbart, 1895)
 Uvarus amandus (LeConte, 1852)
 Uvarus andreinii (Régimbart, 1905)
 Uvarus angustulus Biström, 1988
 Uvarus baoulicus (Guignot, 1939)
 Uvarus barombicus Bilardo, 1982
 Uvarus betsimisarakus (Guignot, 1939)
 Uvarus binaghii Pederzani & Sanfilippo, 1978
 Uvarus caprai Pederzani & Sanfilippo, 1978
 Uvarus captiosus (Guignot, 1948)
 Uvarus chappuisi (Peschet, 1932)
 Uvarus costaricensis (Guignot, 1939)
 Uvarus densepunctatus Bilardo & Rocchi, 2002
 Uvarus devroyei (Gschwendtner, 1932)
 Uvarus ejuncidus (Guignot, 1948)
 Uvarus elotus (Guignot, 1942)
 Uvarus falli (Young, 1940)
 Uvarus fastuosus Biström, 1988
 Uvarus flavicans (Régimbart, 1895)
 Uvarus granarius (Aubé, 1838)
 Uvarus ibonum Biström, 1988
 Uvarus infimus (Guignot, 1953)
 Uvarus inflatus (Young, 1950)
 Uvarus lacustris (Say, 1823)
 Uvarus lanzai Pederzani & Rocchi, 1982
 Uvarus laurentius Biström, 1995
 Uvarus limicola Bilardo & Pederzani, 1978
 Uvarus livens (Régimbart, 1892)
 Uvarus lutarius (Guignot, 1939)
 Uvarus magensis (Clark, 1862)
 Uvarus mauritiensis (Régimbart, 1897)
 Uvarus medleri Biström, 1988
 Uvarus miser Bilardo & Pederzani, 1979
 Uvarus nigeriensis Biström, 1988
 Uvarus nubilus (Régimbart, 1895)
 Uvarus omalus Guignot, 1956
 Uvarus omichlodes Guignot, 1957
 Uvarus opacus (Gschwendtner, 1935)
 Uvarus peringueyi (Régimbart, 1895)
 Uvarus pictipes (Lea, 1899)
 Uvarus pinheyi Biström, 2000
 Uvarus poggii Franciscolo & Sanfilippo, 1990
 Uvarus quadrilineatus (Zimmermann, 1923)
 Uvarus quadrimaculatus Bilardo & Rocchi, 1990
 Uvarus retiarius (Guignot, 1939)
 Uvarus rivulorum (Régimbart, 1895)
 Uvarus rogersi (Young, 1941)
 Uvarus satyrus (Guignot, 1939)
 Uvarus sechellensis (Régimbart, 1897)
 Uvarus spretus (Sharp, 1882)
 Uvarus straeleni Biström, 1988
 Uvarus subornatus (Sharp, 1882)
 Uvarus subtilis (LeConte, 1852)
 Uvarus suburbanus (Fall, 1917)
 Uvarus taitii Rocchi, 1991
 Uvarus texanus (Sharp, 1882)
 Uvarus ugandae Biström, 1988
 Uvarus vagefasciatus Bilardo & Rocchi, 1999
 Uvarus venustulus (Gschwendtner, 1933)

References

Dytiscidae genera